The Crocus-class brig-sloops were a class of sloop-of-war built for the Royal Navy, and were the only Royal Navy brig-sloops ever designed rated for 14 guns. The class was designed by the Surveyors of the Navy (Sir William Rule and Sir John Henslow) jointly, and approved on 28 March 1807. Unlike the vast majority of other British brig-sloops built for the Royal Navy in this wartime period, which were built by contractors, construction of the Crocus class was confined to the Admiralty's own dockyards. One vessel was ordered from each of the Royal Dockyards (except Sheerness) on 30 March 1807; four more were ordered during 1808 and a final unit in 1810.  All the ships of the class survived the Napoleonic Wars and were broken up between 1815 and 1833.

Vessels
In the following table, the Crocus-class brig-sloops are listed in the order in which they were ordered.

Citations and references
Citations

References
  

Sloops of the Royal Navy
Sloop classes